Hamzeh Al Aitoni (born 16 January 1986 in Damascus, Syria) is a Syrian footballer who plays as a defender for Al-Nidal, which competes in the Syrian Premier League and is a member of the Syria national football team.

Aitoni was a part of the Syrian U-19 national team that finished in Fourth place at the 2004 AFC U-19 Championship in Malaysia and he was a part of the Syrian U-20 national team at the 2005 FIFA U-20 World Cup in the Netherlands. He plays against Canada and Italy in the group-stage of the FIFA U-20 World Cup and against Brazil in the Round of 16.

Honour and Titles

National Team 
 AFC U-19 Championship 2004: Fourth place
 FIFA U-20 World Cup 2005: Round of 16
 Nehru Cup: 2009 Runner-up

References

External links 
 

1986 births
Living people
Sportspeople from Damascus
Syrian footballers
Association football defenders
Syria international footballers
Syrian expatriate footballers
Expatriate footballers in Jordan
Syrian expatriate sportspeople in Jordan
Al-Majd players
Syrian Premier League players